Archibald v Fife Council [2004] UKHL 32 is a UK labour law case, concerning the Disability Discrimination Act 1995.

Facts
Mrs Archibald was employed as a road sweeper for Fife Council. She had surgery in 1999. Sadly there were complications. She lost the ability to walk and could no longer work. The council kept her as an office worker. She was placed on the shortlist for all upcoming vacancies. As Baroness Hale said in her statement of the facts,

Mrs Archibald argued at the employment tribunal that her dismissal was unlawful under s 4(2) DDA 1995 for discrimination in failing in their duty to make reasonable adjustments (s 6) and causing her substantial disadvantage, particularly the requirement for competitive interviews.

The employment tribunal held that the council's treatment was justified under s 5(1)(b) DDA 1995. The request that competitive interviews be removed would have been too favourable, contrary to s 6(7). Both the Employment Appeal Tribunal and the Inner House of the Court of Session dismissed her appeals.

Judgment
The House of Lords allowed Mrs Archibald's appeal. It held that under s 5 DDA 1995, no finding may be made that less favourable treatment is justified unless the duty to make reasonable adjustments is taken into account. The employer must have made reasonable adjustments, and only then can it be asked whether less favourable treatment (in this case, not hiring Mrs Archibald in the office) is justified. Accordingly, under s 6(3)(c), the duty to make reasonable adjustments included transferring an employee to "fill an existing vacancy" and this can include the possibility that a disabled person be placed at the same or higher grade without any competitive interview if that is reasonable under the circumstances. Such favourable treatment was not at all precluded by s 6(7), which should be read subject to the previous provisions of the section. Furthermore, the duty under the DDA 1995 to make reasonable adjustments overrode the Local Government and Housing Act 1989 s 7 requiring that staff be appointed by merit.

In conclusion, the tribunal had never considered whether the council had fulfilled its s 6 duty, and that the case should be remitted to determine that question.

See also
UK employment discrimination law

Notes

External links
Full text on OPSI website

United Kingdom labour case law
House of Lords cases
2004 in case law
2004 in British law
21st century in Fife